Halocarban (INN; also known as cloflucarban (USAN) and trifluoromethyldichlorocarbanilide; brand name ) is a chemical with antibacterial properties sometimes used in deodorant and soap.

References

Disinfectants
Ureas
Trifluoromethyl compounds
Chloroarenes